Autobuses del Norte metro station is a Mexico City Metro station in Gustavo A. Madero, Mexico City. It is an at-grade station with two side platforms, served by Line 5 (the Yellow Line), between Instituto del Petróleo and La Raza stations. Autobuses del Norte station serves the colonias (neighborhoods) of Ampliación Panamericana and Capultitlan. The station's pictogram features the front of an intercity bus, and its name is on account of its proximity to Mexico City's Northern Bus Terminal. Autobuses del Norte metro station was opened on 30 August 1982, on the first day of the Politécnico–Pantitlán service. The station is partially accessible. In 2019, the station had an average daily ridership of 22,685 passengers, making it the 68th busiest station in the network and the third busiest of the line.

Location
Autobuses del Norte is a metro station located along Eje Central (in the section formerly known as 100 Metros Avenue), Gustavo A. Madero, northern Mexico City. The station serves the colonias (Mexican Spanish for "neighborhoods") of Ampliación Panamericana and Capultitlan. Within the system, the station lies between Instituto del Petróleo and La Raza stations. The northern bus station's destinations include Acapulco, Guadalajara, Matamoros, Monterrey, San Miguel de Allende, and Tijuana, among others. The area is also serviced by Line 1 (formerly Line A) of the trolleybus system, by Route 15-A of the city's public bus system, and by Routes 23 and 103 of the Red de Transporte de Pasajeros network.

Exits
There are four exits:
East: Eje Central, Capultitlan.
Northwest: Poniente 118 Street, Ampliación Panamericana.
Southeast: Poniente 116 Street, Ampliación Panamericana.
Southwest: Poniente 116 Street, Ampliación Panamericana.

History and construction
Line 5 of the Mexico City Metro was built by Cometro, a subsidiary of Empresas ICA, and its last section was opened on 30 August 1982, operating from Pantitlán to Politécnico stations. The station's pictogram represents the front view of an intercity bus. The station is partially accessible for people with disabilities.

In June 2006, Metro authorities replaced the railroad switches; in 2008, they had maintenance work done on the station's roof.

Ridership
According to the data provided by the authorities since the 2000s, commuters have averaged per year between 11,800 and 24,700 daily entrances in the last decade. In 2019, before the impact of the COVID-19 pandemic on public transport, the station's ridership totaled 8,280,147 passengers, which was a decrease of 77,106 passengers compared to 2018. In the same year, the station was the 68th busiest station of the system's 195 stations, and it was the 3rd busiest on Line 5.

Gallery

Notes

References

External links

1982 establishments in Mexico
Accessible Mexico City Metro stations
Mexico City Metro Line 5 stations
Mexico City Metro stations in Gustavo A. Madero, Mexico City
Railway stations opened in 1982